Elasmaspis is a trilobite in the order Phacopida, that existed during the upper Ordovician in what is now Russia. It was described by Kramarenko in 1957, and the type species is Elasmaspis speciosa. The type locality was the Dzheron Formation in Siberia.

References

External links
 Elasmaspis at the Paleobiology Database

Fossil taxa described in 1957
Ordovician trilobites
Fossils of Russia
Pterygometopidae
Phacopida genera